A solid-state drive is a type of data storage device which uses semiconductor memory rather than magnetic media.

SSD may also refer to:

Science and technology
 Saturated-surface-dry, aggregate or porous solid condition

Biology and medicine
 Schizophrenia spectrum disorders
 Signal-sensing domain, in molecular biology
 Sterol-sensing domain, a protein domain
 Speech sound disorder
 Sexual size dimorphism
 Single-sided deafness
 Somatic symptom disorder
 A brand name for Silver sulfadiazine antibacterial

Computing
 Server-side decoration of windows, an alternative to client-side decoration
 Single-shot multibox detection, computer vision object detection
 System sequence diagram in software engineering

Mathematics
 Schwartz sequential dropping, an electoral system

Other uses
 Sardar Sarovar Dam, Gujarat, India
 Scalextric Sport Digital, toy cars
 Singapore School for the Deaf
 South Sudan (ISO 3166-1 alpha-3 code: SSD)
 SSD (band), Boston, US, 1981–1985
 Siroi language (ISO code: ssd), of Papua New Guinea
 Special School District of St. Louis County
 Stansted Airport railway station (National Rail code: SSD)
 Social Security Disability Insurance (SSD or SSDI), US
 State Security Department, North Korean secret police
 United States–Russia Strategic Stability Dialogue, meetings to reduce the risk of US–Russia nuclear war